The Kimberley Plan, was a failed plan by the Freeland League to resettle Jewish refugees from Europe in northern Australia before and during the Holocaust.

With rampant anti-Semitism in Europe, the Freeland League for Jewish Territorial Colonization was formed in London in July 1935, to search for a potential Jewish homeland and haven. The League was a non-Zionist organisation and was led by Isaac Nachman Steinberg. The League sent a Yiddish poet and essayist Melech Ravitch to the Northern Territory in the 1930s to investigate the region and to collect data on topography and climate.

Investigations
The tract in question was that of Connor, Doherty and Durack Limited, including Auvergne Station, Newry Station, and Argyle Downs, and extending between the Ord and Victoria Rivers. Under the plan, an initial 500-600 pioneers would arrive to construct basic necessities for the settlement such as homes, irrigation works, and a power station, followed by the arrival of the main body of immigrants. Ravitch in his report to the League promoted a bigger number than Steinberg, suggesting the area could accommodate a million Jewish refugees.

Steinberg (1888–1957) was sent out from London to further investigate the scheme's feasibility and to enlist governmental and communal endorsement. He arrived in Perth on 23 May 1939. Steinberg was a skilled emissary, and based his campaign on the officially declared need by Australia to populate northern Australia.

By early 1940, he won the support of churches, leading newspapers, many prominent political and public figures (including Western Australian Premier John Willcock) and a number of Jewish leaders, but he also encountered opposition. Steinberg left Australia in June 1943 to rejoin his family in Canada.

Opposition
A 1944 opinion poll found that 47% of Australians opposed the scheme. Opposition was primarily based on concerns that the settlers would inevitably drift away from Kimberley and begin migrating to the cities in large numbers. On 15 July 1944 the scheme was vetoed by the Australian government and Labor Prime Minister John Curtin (with bipartisan support) informed Steinberg that the Australian government would not "depart from the long-established policy in regard to alien settlement in Australia" and could not "entertain the proposal for a group settlement of the exclusive type contemplated by the Freeland League".

In 1948 Steinberg published a book on his experience, titled Australia – the Unpromised Land: in search of a home.

However, even after Israel was created in 1949, Steinberg tried once more – unsuccessfully – approaching the newly re-elected Robert Menzies in 1950. But Menzies replied that the idea ran contrary to his government's policy of assimilation aimed at achieving "the ideal of one Australian family of peoples, devoid of foreign communities."

See also

 Andinia Plan
 Fugu Plan
 Jewish Autonomous Oblast
 Madagascar Plan
Port Davey, another location proposed for Jewish resettlement in Australia during WWII. 
 Proposals for a Jewish state
 Uganda Scheme
 Zionism

References

Jewish emigration from Nazi Germany
History of Australia (1901–1945)
Jewish Australian history
International response to the Holocaust
Kimberley (Western Australia)
Settlement schemes in Australia
Jewish settlement schemes